Kees Slot (14 May 1909 – 3 December 1962) was a Dutch footballer. He played in one match for the Netherlands national football team in 1940.

References

External links
 

1909 births
1962 deaths
Dutch footballers
Netherlands international footballers
Place of birth missing
Association footballers not categorized by position